James Nipperess (born 21 May 1990) is an Australian long distance runner who specialized in the steeplechase. He won 6 Australian titles in the 3000m steeplechase, and also won an Australian Cross Country Championship. He competed at the 2015 World Championships in Beijing and World Cross Country Championships in Guiyang.

Competition record

Personal bests
Outdoor
800 metres – 1:49.61 (Sydney 2009)
1500 metres – 3:41.01 (Melbourne 2009)
3000 metres – 7:55.79 (Sydney 2020)
5000 metres – 13:56.55 (Hobart 2009)
3000 metres steeplechase – 8:30.13 (Sydney 2021)

References

External links
 
 James Nipperess at Athletics Australia
 James Nipperess at Australian Athletics Historical Results
 

1990 births
Living people
Australian male middle-distance runners
Australian male steeplechase runners
World Athletics Championships athletes for Australia
Athletes (track and field) at the 2014 Commonwealth Games
Athletes (track and field) at the 2018 Commonwealth Games
Commonwealth Games competitors for Australia
Place of birth missing (living people)
Competitors at the 2011 Summer Universiade
Competitors at the 2013 Summer Universiade